The 2005–06 Creighton Bluejays men's basketball team represented Creighton University in the 2005–06 NCAA Division I men's basketball season. Led by head coach Dana Altman in his 12th season, the Bluejays would end the season with a record of 20–10 (12-6 MVC). They qualified for the NIT where they defeated Akron before losing to Miami (FL) in the second round.

Roster

Postseason

2006 Missouri Valley Conference men's basketball tournament
3/3/06 Vs. Bradley @ Savvis Center L, 47-54
2006 National Invitation Tournament
3/16/06 Vs. Akron @ Qwest Center Omaha W, 71-60
3/20/06 Vs. Miami (FL) @ Qwest Center Omaha L, 52-53

References

Creighton Bluejays men's basketball seasons
Creighton
Creighton
Creighton Bluejays Men's Basketball
Creighton Bluejays Men's Basketball